Pazzo Ristorante, or simply Pazzo, was an Italian restaurant in Portland, Oregon, in the United States.

Description

Pazzo was an Italian restaurant housed in the Kimpton Hotel Vintage Portland in downtown Portland. Elizabeth Dye of Willamette Week said the restaurant had "high-backed" booths, a "gleaming copper-fitted" kitchen, and starched tablecloths, with "expertly prepared Italian classics--generous sprawling salads, toothsome pasta plates, and rich beef and veal entrees".

History
Chef and restaurateur David Machado opened Pazzo. Chefs at the restaurant included Oswaldo Bibiano, Scott Dolich, Kenny Giambalvo, and Vitaly Paley. In 2015, John Eisenhart left to become chef of Nel Centro, after serving as Pazzo's chef for eleven years.

Pazzo was later owned by Heathman Group, along with the Hotel Vintage Plaza.

The restaurant closed after brunch on January 1, 2018, with plans to be replaced by a restaurant with a New York-style Italian menu after a months-long renovation. Following the $3 million renovation, the restaurant was replaced by Il Solito in May 2018.

Reception
Portland Monthly described the food as "refreshingly sharp". Julie Lee included Pazzo in 1859 2016 overview of the city's best Italian restaurants, in which she described Pazzo as "a time-honored anchor in the epicenter of downtown Portland, serving the lunchtime business community and romantics seeking an elegant evening out for the past two decades". She wrote, "Everything spun out of the open kitchen is wicked delicious; some favorites include the Strozzapreti, with Dungeness crab and Calabrian peppers, and the mushroom & black truffle pizza with an organic egg topping."

See also

 List of defunct restaurants of the United States
 List of Italian restaurants

References

External links

 Pazzo Ristorante at Zomato

2018 disestablishments in Oregon
Defunct Italian restaurants in Portland, Oregon
Restaurants disestablished in 2018
Southwest Portland, Oregon
Year of establishment missing